Escunta is the fifth album by Canadian grindcore band Fuck the Facts.  It was created and recorded in January 2001 at Total Bastard Studio.  This release is different from most of the other Fuck the Facts releases because it is more focused on an experimental noise sound.  In that sense, it is following the type of sound found on Vagina Dancer.

When this was recorded, Fuck the Facts was still a solo project by Topon Das.  However, at the time of this release, a full lineup had been established and Mullet Fever had already been released.  It is unknown why it took more than a year to be released, but the original Fuck the Facts website states as of January 2001 (the same time it was recorded) that it was to be released on tape by R.U. Produkt.  It is unknown if that ever happened.

Track listing
"Ottawa" - 9:04
"My Revenge" - 1:35
"Shoes = Power" - 6:47
"Fuck the Facts Is Sexy" - 3:21
"Killing Matt with Alcohol" - 1:40
"What's the Deal?" - 1:15
"They Call It Dance Musick" - 5:37
"Brown Noise" - 14:49

Personnel
Topon Das - all instruments and recording

2002 albums
Fuck the Facts albums
Noise rock albums by Canadian artists